Tubbercurry railway station is a disused railway station associated with the town of Tubbercurry in County Sligo, Ireland. The station was originally opened in 1895, as part of the route between Claremorris and Sligo. It was closed to passenger traffic in 1963, with goods traffic ending in 1975.

References

Iarnród Éireann stations in County Sligo
Railway stations opened in 1895
Railway stations closed in 1975
1895 establishments in Ireland
1975 disestablishments in Ireland
Railway stations in the Republic of Ireland opened in the 19th century